The Mozilla Open Software Patent License (MOSPL) is a permissive patent license developed and maintained by the Mozilla Foundation.

References

Software patent law
Intellectual property activism